Nineveh is an unincorporated community in Nineveh Township, Johnson County, Indiana, United States.

Nineveh took its name from Nineveh Creek, which in turn is named after Nineveh Berry, a hunter who fell into the creek while hunting for deer.

The town also has the Cordry-Sweetwater branch library.

Scenes from the film Hoosiers were shot in the old Nineveh Elementary School, which was renamed "Hickory High School" for the film. Nineveh's last class of students attended here during the filming of the film in 1985, after which they relocated to Trafalgar to consolidate at Indian Creek Elementary School. The old school was lost to a fire just a few years after it was closed for consolidation.

Notable people
William Merritt Chase, painter
Cliff Griffith, Indy car driver
Harry McQuinn, Indy car driver

References

External links 

Unincorporated communities in Johnson County, Indiana
Unincorporated communities in Indiana
Indianapolis metropolitan area